Bijar Boneh may refer to:
 Bijar Boneh, Lahijan
 Bijar Boneh-ye Bala, Lahijan County
 Bijar Boneh-ye Pain, Lahijan County
 Bijar Boneh, Rasht